Benton is a city in Butler County, Kansas, United States.  As of the 2020 census, the population of the city was 943.

History
Benton was founded in 1884. It was named for Thomas Benton Murdock, a state politician. Benton was incorporated as a city in 1908.

In 1969, part of the film The Gypsy Moths was shot in the Benton area.

Geography
Benton is located at  (37.789302, -97.108402).

Demographics

2010 census
As of the census of 2010, there were 880 people, 325 households, and 254 families residing in the city. The racial makeup of the city was 97.3% White, 0.1% African American, 0.6% Native American, 0.7% Asian, 0.5% from other races, and 0.9% from two or more races. Hispanic or Latino of any race were 2.7% of the population.

There were 325 households, of which 42.8% had children under the age of 18 living with them, 61.2% were married couples living together, 12.6% had a female householder with no husband present, 4.3% had a male householder with no wife present, and 21.8% were non-families. 18.8% of all households were made up of individuals, and 9.3% had someone living alone who was 65 years of age or older. The average household size was 2.71 and the average family size was 3.08.

The median age in the city was 36 years. 29.1% of residents were under the age of 18; 6.4% were between the ages of 18 and 24; 27.1% were from 25 to 44; 24.2% were from 45 to 64; and 13.3% were 65 years of age or older. The gender makeup of the city was 49.4% male and 50.6% female.

2000 census
As of the census of 2000, there were 827 people, 308 households, and 238 families residing in the city. The racial makeup of the city was 97.46% White, 0.12% African American, 0.24% Native American, 0.24% Asian, 0.48% from other races, and 1.45% from two or more races. Hispanic or Latino of any race were 1.33% of the population.

There were 308 households, out of which 36.0% had children under the age of 18 living with them, 64.9% were married couples living together, 8.8% had a female householder with no husband present, and 22.7% were non-families. 20.1% of all households were made up of individuals, and 8.1% had someone living alone who was 65 years of age or older. The average household size was 2.69 and the average family size was 3.07.

In the city, the population was spread out, with 28.1% under the age of 18, 7.9% from 18 to 24, 28.5% from 25 to 44, 23.3% from 45 to 64, and 12.2% who were 65 years of age or older. The median age was 34 years. For every 100 females, there were 99.8 males. For every 100 females age 18 and over, there were 99.7 males.

The median income for a household in the city was $49,750, and the median income for a family was $58,214. Males had a median income of $40,380 versus $30,179 for females. The per capita income for the city was $21,975. About 3.8% of families and 5.5% of the population were below the poverty line, including 10.5% of those under age 18 and none of those age 65 or over.

Education
The community is served by Circle USD 375 public school district.  Benton is home to Circle Benton Elementary and Circle Middle School.  The middle school is visible as one drives on the highway past K-254.

Benton High School was closed through school unification. The Benton Tigers won the Kansas State High School class B baseball championship in 1957.

Circle Middle School 
Circle Middle School is the home of the Thunderbolts. The school is a part of the Walnut Valley League (WVL). Students from Circle Benton Elementary, Circle Towanda Elementary, Circle Greenwich Elementary, and Circle Oil Hill Elementary attend this school in their seventh and eighth grades. After graduating, the students move onto Circle High School in Towanda.

Circle Middle School used to be a combination of Circle Benton Elementary and Circle Towanda Elementary, which, at the time, were both K-8 schools. Circle Oil Hill Elementary bused their kids over to Circle Towanda Elementary for classes. When the schools became too crowded due to the influx of jobs in nearby Wichita, El Dorado, and Andover, the school board voted to build a middle school in Benton. The project was completed by Summer 2002. Classes began in the fall. The first 8th grade class to go through the middle school graduated in 2007 from Circle High School.

References

Further reading

External links

 City of Benton
 Benton - Directory of Public Officials
 Benton city map, KDOT

Cities in Kansas
Cities in Butler County, Kansas
Wichita, KS Metropolitan Statistical Area
1884 establishments in Kansas
Populated places established in 1884